Calophyllum mooni is a species of flowering plant in the Calophyllaceae family. It is found only in Sri Lanka.

References

mooni
Endemic flora of Sri Lanka
Vulnerable plants
Taxonomy articles created by Polbot